Urospermum dalechampii, the smooth golden fleece, is a perennial herbaceous plant  belonging to the genus Urospermum of the family Asteraceae.

Description
This plant is quite hairy, with a single or branched stem. Basal leaves are usually arranged in a rosette of toothed leaves, while cauline leaves are just a few and smaller, more or less undivided and amplexicaul. The flowers are hermaphrodite. The flower heads are yellow sulfur, about five centimeter wide. Involucral bracts vary from seven to eight. Blooms are abundant throughout the Spring. The flowering period extends from March through August. The long, beaked fruit is an achene, and has a feathery, slightly reddish pappus

Gallery

Distribution
This plant occurs in Western and Central Mediterranean from Spain to Dalmatia and North Africa.

Habitat
They are commonly grown in drained soil and sunny places throughout the year.

References
 Pignatti S. - Flora d'Italia - Edagricole – 1982. vol. III

External links
 Biolib

Cichorieae
Flora of Italy